Hlushyn is a village (selo) in Zolochiv Raion, Lviv Oblast, in western Ukraine. It belongs to Brody urban hromada, one of the hromadas of Ukraine. 
Area of the village totals is 2.01 km2 and the population of village is just about 276 persons. Local government is administered by Ponykovytska village council. 

From 1918 to 1939 the village was in Tarnopol Voivodeship in Poland.

Until 18 July 2020, Hlushyn belonged to Brody Raion. The raion was abolished in July 2020 as part of the administrative reform of Ukraine, which reduced the number of raions of Lviv Oblast to seven. The area of Brody Raion was merged into Zolochiv Raion.

Geography 
The village is located on the right bank of the upper reaches Styr River.

Religious structures 
In the village there are two churches:
 Church Dormition of the Theotokos  (1920, wooden) (UGCC)
 Church Dormition of the Theotokos  (stone) (OCU)

People from Hlushyn 
 Roman Bezpalkiv (1938 - 2009) – Ukrainian painter, Honored Art Worker of Ukraine.
 Bezpalkiv Mykhaylo (1939) – Ukrainian painter, Honored Art Worker of Ukraine.

References

External links 
 gska2.rada.gov.ua
 village Hlushyn

Villages in Zolochiv Raion, Lviv Oblast